Paduka Sri Sultan Sulaiman Shah II ibni al-Marhum Sultan Mudzaffar Shah III (died 28 February 1626) was the 12th Sultan of Kedah. His reign was from 1602 to 1626. During his reign, raids from Aceh Sultanate had destroyed many black pepper plantation in Langkawi, as Aceh wanted to monopolize the industry. He built Kota Kuala Bahang as a defensive fortress in response to the Aceh raid with assistance from the Portuguese Empire. A huge raid from Aceh in 1619 destroyed the fortress and forced the Portuguese to evacuate.

External links
 List of Sultans of Kedah

1626 deaths
17th-century Sultans of Kedah